
Warus Quta (Aymara  grey-brown,  lake, "grey-brown lake", also spelled Barros Kota) is a lake in the Cordillera Real in the Andes of Bolivia. It is situated in the La Paz Department, Larecaja Province, Sorata Municipality. Warus Quta lies south-east of the mountains Wiluyu Janq'u Uma and Yapuchañani and north-east of Uma Jalanta.

References 

Lakes of La Paz Department (Bolivia)